The episodes covering the first two seasons of The Prince of Tennis anime series are directed by Takayuki Hamana, animated by Trans Arts, and co-produced by Nihon Ad Systems, J.C.Staff, and Production I.G. It originally aired on the terrestrial Japanese network TV Tokyo from October 2001 to October 2002. The anime is an adaptation of Takeshi Konomi's Prince of Tennis manga series created in 2000, and the story revolves around a 12-year-old tennis prodigy named Ryoma Echizen, who moves back to his native Japan in order to attend his father's alma mater, Seishun Academy, a private middle school famous for its strong tennis team.

Viz Media handles the distribution of the series in North America, where the episodes debuted as streaming media on Viz's and Cartoon Network's joint online broadband service called Toonami Jetstream on July 14, 2006. It first began airing on North American television as part of Toonami's Saturday programming block on December 23, 2006. However, it was removed from Toonami's schedule on June 9, 2007, and was also removed from Toonami Jetstream after episode fifty's broadcast on December 3, 2007. As of January 15, 2008, a total of four DVD compilations, containing the first fifty episodes of the two seasons, have been released by Viz Media. All four compilations contain three discs, each containing four episodes, save the final discs of the first two compilations, which contain five episodes.

Five pieces of theme music are used for the Japanese language episodes; two opening themes and three ending themes. The two opening themes, "Future", used for the first season, and "Driving Myself", used for the second, are both performed by Hiro-X. The first ending theme, "You Got Game" by Kimeru, is used for the first season. For the second season, there are two ending themes which periodically alternates, "Keep your style" and "Walk On", both performed by Masataka Fujishige. In the English language episodes, the opening and ending themes were replaced with electronic music compositions.

Episode list

Season 1
Intraschool Rankings Saga – Part I (Eps. 1–10)

Tokyo Preliminaries Saga – Part I: Fudomine Jr. High (Eps. 11–20)

Seigaku's Training Saga – Part I (Eps. 21–26)

Season 2
Tokyo Metropolitan Tournament Saga – Part II: St. Rudolph Academy (Eps. 27–36)

Seigaku's Training Saga – Part II (Eps. 37–40)

Tokyo Metropolitan Tournament Saga – Part III: Yamabuki Jr. High (Eps. 41–45)

Intraschool Rankings Saga – Part II (Episodes 46–53)

References
General
 – Official list of original Japanese episode titles.

Specific

External links
Official Prince of Tennis website 
TV Tokyo's Prince of Tennis website 

2001 Japanese television seasons
2002 Japanese television seasons
Season 1-2